"Starbucks" is a single by British rock band A, taken from their album Hi-Fi Serious loosely based on the coffee company. It reached number 20 in the UK Singles Charts.

Track listing
CD 1 
"Starbucks"
"Some People"
"Champion of Endings"
"Starbucks" (Video)

CD 2
"Starbucks"
"Monterey"
"Coming Around"
"Coming Around" (Video)

A (band) songs
2002 singles